Kutuzovo is the name of several rural localities in Russia:
Kutuzovo, Guryevsky District, Kaliningrad Oblast, a settlement in Kutuzovsky Rural Okrug of Guryevsky District of Kaliningrad Oblast
Kutuzovo, Krasnoznamensky District, Kaliningrad Oblast, a settlement in Dobrovolsky Rural Okrug of Krasnoznamensky District of Kaliningrad Oblast
Kutuzovo, Ozyorsky District, Kaliningrad Oblast, a settlement in Gavrilovsky Rural Okrug of Ozyorsky District of Kaliningrad Oblast
Kutuzovo, Moscow, a village under the administrative jurisdiction of Zelenograd, Moscow
Kutuzovo, Moscow Oblast, a village under the administrative jurisdiction of Domodedovo City Under Oblast Jurisdiction, Moscow Oblast
Kutuzovo, Nizhny Novgorod Oblast, a village in Veryakushsky Selsoviet of Diveyevsky District of Nizhny Novgorod Oblast
Kutuzovo, Oryol Oblast, a village in Timiryazevsky Selsoviet of Kolpnyansky District of Oryol Oblast
Kutuzovo, Pskov Oblast, a village in Pskovsky District of Pskov Oblast
Kutuzovo, Kalyazinsky District, Tver Oblast, a village in Kalyazinsky District, Tver Oblast
Kutuzovo, Spirovsky District, Tver Oblast, a village in Spirovsky District, Tver Oblast